The Boat on the Grass is a 1971 French film directed by Gérard Brach. It was entered into the 1971 Cannes Film Festival.

Cast
 Claude Jade - Eleonore
 Jean-Pierre Cassel - David
 John McEnery - Oliver
 Valentina Cortese - Christine
 Paul Préboist - Leon
 Micha Bayard - Germaine
 Pierre Asso - Alexis
 Jean de Coninck - Jean-Claude

Plot summary
In this gentle, tragic drama, Olivier (John McEnery) is a wealthy young man. He spends his time building a boat on the lawn with his friend David (Jean-Pierre Cassel), a poor fisherman whom he grew up with. Though hardly idyllic, the relative calm provided by their friendship is disrupted by Eleonore (Claude Jade), a cute and determined young woman who sets her sights on David. She wants to wean David from his friendship with Olivier and plays on David's long-dormant jealousy of Olivier's wealth and easy life. Eleonore also plays the flipside of the jealousy issue, claiming that Olivier has made passes at her.

Vincent Canby: "Adorable Acting, especially by Claude Jade, who brings the right mixture of conventionalism and self-interest into her role."

The film was nominated for the Grand Prix and the Prix du Jury

References

External links

 
 

1971 films
1971 drama films
Films set in Paris
French drama films
1970s French-language films
Films directed by Gérard Brach
Films with screenplays by Gérard Brach
Films with screenplays by Roman Polanski
1970s French films